WAMM is a country and Americana formatted broadcast radio station licensed to Mount Jackson, Virginia, serving Woodstock and Shenandoah County, Virginia. WAMM is owned and operated by Shenandoah Valley Group, Inc.

History

In January 2004, the then-WSVG applied to move to Grottoes, Virginia, in the larger Harrisonburg-Staunton-Waynesboro market. A sale to Shenandoah Valley Television, then the owner of WBOP (106.3 FM) and WSIG (96.9 FM) in that market, fell through later in the year; then-owners Hometown Radio of Mount Jackson allowed the application to expire afterwards.

On July 6, 2009, Shenandoah Valley Group, Inc. bought WSVG for $175,000.

WSVG flipped to an Americana music format, consisting largely of country music with rock mixed in, during October 2016. Previously, it had run a local news/talk format with sports coverage. On January 26, 2018, WSVG was granted a construction permit for FM translator W250CR on 97.9 in Mount Jackson, pursuant to the Federal Communications Commission's AM revitalization program; the translator signed on in January 2021. On September 30, the station's call sign was changed to WAMM.

From 1981-1982 Ray Satterfield hosted a morning talk show: "Ray Thomas-WAMM in the Morning", Frank Wilt Program Director. https://www.linkedin.com/in/frank-wilt-b0466741/ special features and characters: "WAMM Traffic Copter" recurring bit, "Forgery Coffee" ad spoofs, "Granny Grits" recurring bit

References

External links
 790 AM WAMM Online

AMM (AM)
Americana radio stations
Radio stations established in 1954
1954 establishments in Virginia
Mount Jackson, Virginia